Luciano Perez-Rivera Santiago (21 June 1942 –  1 February 2019) was a Filipino writer, historian, and psychiatrist best known for his award-winning books on Philippine history and the arts.
He was a psychiatrist by profession.

Education 
Dr. Santiago was an alumnus of the University of the Philippines College of Medicine in Manila.  After graduating, he trained in both adult and child psychiatry  at the Sheppard and Enoch Pratt Hospital in Baltimore, Maryland and practiced there for a while before returning to the Philippines to be a physician at the Department of Psychiatry of The Medical City Hospital in Pasig.

Awards 
Santiago has received a number of prizes and awards for his work, including:
 The National Book Award for Art and for History (from the Manila Critics Circle), 
 The Wendell Muncie Prize for Distinguished Writing in Psychiatry (from the Maryland Psychiatric Society), 
 The Premio Manuel Bernabé (Primer Premio) in History (from the Centro Cultural de la Embajada de Espana), 
 The Dr. Pedro Villaseñor Award for Genealogy, 
 The Catholic Author Award (from the Asian Catholic Publishers)
 The Catholic Press Award (from the Archdiocese of Manila), and 
 a Research Grant Award from the Toyota International Foundation.

References 

1942 births
2019 deaths
Filipino psychiatrists
20th-century Filipino historians
Writers from Metro Manila
University of the Philippines Manila alumni